Henry Goulstone (22 October 1836 – 20 March 1914) was an early European immigrant to New Zealand, where he was a financier and magistrate.

Biography
Goulstone was born on 22 October 1836 in Long Ashton, England, as one of 12 children, and baptised in the Church of England faith. His father was school master and proprietor of the Ashton Gate Academy.

In 1841, at the age of five, he was living with his parents and seven of his brothers and sisters in North Street, Bedminster, Bristol.

Goulstone arrived in Melbourne, Australia, on 29 March 1858, having sailed alone from Liverpool on the Tornado.

From Melbourne, Goulstone moved on to Queensland, and lived for about three years in a small place called Darling Downs, where he ran his own business. However, he had to leave the locality on account of his health. On 11 May 1860 Goulstone arrived in Sydney, having sailed from Brisbane on the ship the Telegraph of Sydney. Just over a week later on 19 May he married Mary Sayer Cox.

Their first child, Newton Henry Goulstone, was born on 1 July 1861, at Belgrave Terrace, Sydney. On 5 August 1861 Goulstone started work at the head office in Sydney of the Bank of New South Wales.

Sometime between August and January the family moved to Auckland, New Zealand and on 4 January 1862, Goulstone was appointed as the Acting Accountant, Bank of New South Wales, Auckland, at a salary of £300 per annum.

Goulstone quickly rose through the ranks of the bank and he moved with his family to Napier where he was made acting bank manager on 30 October 1862. This was to be a short stay as the branch was closed on 7 December 1863, though long enough for Mary to give birth to their second son, William Fitzhugh Goulstone. While in Napier Goulstone took part in the Anniversary Day Rifle Shooting contest on 16 November 1863.

On 1 April 1863, Goulstone sent a note to Donald McLean, confirming an appointment with him for the following day. Unfortunately no account of the meeting has been uncovered, so it is presently a mystery as to why Goulstone went to see Sir Donald. The letter (at right), is currently the only surviving written document of him.

From Napier, Goulstone and his family moved to the South Island, and in 1865, Mary gave birth to their first daughter, Amie (sometimes written Amy) Florence Goulstone, in Lyttelton. This time in Lyttelton could have been a brief holiday or interlude between postings with the bank. It is maybe possible that his wife, Mary, stayed by herself in Lyttelton, with friends or relatives, while he continued with his bank work in Auckland.

After much moving around, Goulstone, his wife and their three young children settled in Nelson and on 8 September 1865 Goulstone was made Acting Bank Manager of the Nelson branch of the Bank of New South Wales, at a salary of £500 per annum.

While in Nelson, Goulstone played cricket for the bank, one such annual fixture being reported on in the Nelson Examiner. On 29 March 1869 Goulstone opened the batting for the Banks Eleven vs the College Eleven. He made 15 in the first innings and 1 in the second and took one catch. The bank beat the college by two wickets.

The Duke was the second son of Queen Victoria and Prince Albert. There was a very large welcome put on for the Duke, with many dignitaries and speakers. Goulstone himself was among the invited guests to personally meet with the Duke.

Two of Goulstone's donations to causes of the day were recorded by the local paper. Firstly, in June 1866, Goulstone donated the sum of two pounds and two shillings to the New Zealand Patriotic Fund. Later that same year in August, there was a very large fire in Nelson that destroyed 18 homes, Goulstone donated two pounds to the fire relief fund.

On 14 June 1873, Goulstone was elected by the ratepayers to the Nelson Education Board. The meeting and election took place at the Nelson Court-house. In this capacity as a board member, Goulstone took the chair at the annual Town Schools prize giving in December 1873, this included the giving of a short speech and the overseeing of the presentation of the prizes.

While in Nelson, Goulstone became a Magistrate, and in such capacity took part in the Annual Licensing meeting held on 20 June 1871. Goulstone and four other magistrates met to hear any new liquor applications and also to oversee the correct behaviour of the 40 Public Houses that were all ready in operation in the Nelson area. At this meeting one new application was granted to the Mitre Hotel.

Also in his capacity as a Magistrate, Goulstone had had to sit on the jury of the Supreme Court of Nelson on numerous occasions. Three such occasions where Goulstone was a juror were recorded in the local paper as follows:

 Civil Sitting, Monday 13 July 1868, Trimble vs New Zealand Insurance.
 Civil Sitting, 9 and 10 August 1871, Pike vs Travers. This was an action to recover the sum of one thousand five hundred pounds, the amount of a promissory note, with interest since September 1864.
 Criminal Sittings, Monday 20 November 1871. This included the trying of six criminal cases, none of a very serious nature.

In 1866 Goulstone briefly gave evidence in the Maungatapu murders trial, in his capacity as the acting manager of the Bank of New South Wales. This was in relation to whether he saw one of the accused come into his bank and exchange some money.

Goulstone was a founding investor and share holder in the Perseverance Mining Company. The company was formed on 15 January 1870 to mine for gold in the Bedstead Gully and Golden Gully area, in Golden Bay. To this end the company leased 16 acres of crown land in this area for a period of 15 years. The company went out of business in the late 1870s, with another company taking over the mine site in 1879. Goulstone was also a director of the company from its founding up until 21 November 1870 when he stepped down. However, as of 8 March 1871 he was still a shareholder, attending a
special general meeting of the company as such.

Children in Nelson

Another son was born to them, on 7 November 1867, Harold James Goulstone. On 24 September 1870, Mary had twin boys Cyril Thorpe Goulstone and Alexander Goulstone . Sadly, less than three months later, Cyril died on 13 December of 'debility'. And just a couple of weeks before his second birthday, Alexander died, on 6 September 1872, of 'congestion of the lungs'. Despite these tragedies, they had their second daughter, Ella Margaret Irene Goulstone late 1871 and their third daughter, Agnes Lillias, on 12 May 1873, and their fourth and last daughter, Rosa Theodora, on 25 September 1875. Shortly after this Goulstone resigned from the bank on 31 October and they moved back to Auckland.

Auckland

In Auckland Goulstone undertook a number of roles and employment. He joined the New Zealand Loan and Mercantile Agency Company as its colonial accountant. In 1902 Goulstone was Secretary of the Auckland Fire Underwriters' Association, and also of the Mackelvie Trust. In 1904 he was the Secretary of the Auckland Chamber of Commerce. Goulstone also undertook auditing work. For example, he was the auditor of Sharland and Co. (Limited) from the early 1890s up until December 1907 when he had to resign due to ill health.

Later in 1877, Goulstone returned, by himself, to Sydney, arriving there on 26 November on the Rotorua. He started work back at the head office of the Bank of New South Wales on 3 December. He was put in temporary charge of the Balmain branch on 25 April 1878, returned to head office on 7 June, and resigned on 30 September 1878. Goulstone returned to Auckland on the Hero on 8 October 1878.

Sometime between 1878 and 1881, Goulstone bought a farm in Whakatane. But by 1885 he was back in Auckland, and the farm was sold in 1913. Goulstone Road in Whakatane is named after this short farming stint.

Funerals and marriages

Henry Goulstone and Mary lived in Park Road, Newmarket. During 1883 his wife contracted tuberculosis and died two years later, on 18 August 1885 and was buried at the Symonds Street Cemetery.

Goulstone was not a man who liked to be alone, however, and on 23 December 1887 he remarried, to Mabel Anna Louisa Roskruge in the St Thomas Church, Tamaki, Auckland.
Mabel was born in Cornwall, England, and moved to New Zealand with her family when she was nine years old, in 1863. Henry and Mabel had two children together, both girls – Cecil Mary in 1889 and Lucy Beatrice in 1892. Unfortunately, though, tragedy was again to befall Goulstone, twofold. On 24 March 1891 his second daughter, Ella Margaret Irene, died, at just 20 years of age of tuberculosis at the family home in Park Road, and in 1892 Mabel also contracted tuberculosis. Mabel died on 12 June 1893 from the tuberculosis, and was buried at the Purewa Cemetery on 14 June 1893.

Three years later on 25 March 1896 Goulstone married his third and last wife, Margaret Alice Haslett. This wedding took place at the home of her brother, James Haslett, Eden Street, Auckland. Margaret was born in Belfast, Ireland and came to New Zealand with her family in 1860 at the age of seven. His third was to outlive Goulstone and died on 21 June 1945 at the age of 92 of heart failure.

Henry Goulstone spent the last days of his life with Margaret in Park Road, Newmarket, Auckland. He died 20 March 1914 at the age of 78 years. The cause of death is listed as 'Senile degeneration & cerebral atrophy'. Goulstone had amassed quite some wealth at the time of his death, his estate was listed for Stamp Duty at £10,284. Goulstone left a watch, silver salver and other various pieces of crockery to his three daughters – Amy, Agnes and Rosa. The remainder of his estate was left in trust to his wife. Goulstone was buried on 21 March at the Purewa Cemetery in Auckland.

References 

1836 births
1914 deaths
English emigrants to New Zealand
New Zealand bankers
District Court of New Zealand judges
Burials at Purewa Cemetery
Colony of New Zealand judges